Ivy Lee (born 16 July 1973) is a Singaporean former actress and host. She was prominently a full-time Mediacorp artiste from 1993 to 2007.

Early life and career
Lee graduated from Singapore Polytechnic with a Diploma in Biomedical in 1993. The same year, she joined TCS (predecessor of MediaCorp) after winning the biannual Star Search and clinching the "Miss Photogenic" title at the same contest.

At the Star Awards 2006, Lee was awarded the Best Actress award for her role as a lawyer in the drama serial Family Matters. Before that, she was also named the Best Actress another two times; the first in 2000, and then in 2004.

Later in her career, Lee was known for her on-screen partnership with actor Edmund Chen, most notably in Beyond the Axis of Truth and Double Happiness. At the Star Awards 2007 anniversary special celebrating 25 years of Chinese drama in Singapore, they were named one of the Top 5 Favourite On-screen Partners for their roles as husband and wife in Double Happiness.

Lee left the entertainment industry in November 2009 and moved to Hong Kong with her family. As of 2017, she moved again to London.

Personal life
Lee currently lives in Hong Kong with her four children and her Hong Kong-born television producer and director husband Raymond Choy. In 1997, she gave birth to a girl. In 2005, Lee gave birth to twin boys. In 2009, she gave birth to another girl. In an interview, Lee stated that she relocated to Hong Kong with her children so as to be nearer to her husband who travels frequently within the Greater China Region.

Filmography

TV series

Variety show host

Compilation album

Accolades

References

External links

Ivy Lee's Profile on Toggle.sg

1973 births
Living people
Singaporean people of Chinese descent
20th-century Singaporean actresses
21st-century Singaporean actresses
Singaporean television actresses
Singaporean television personalities
Singapore Polytechnic alumni